Lyepyel District is a second-level administrative subdivision (raion) of Belarus in the Vitebsk Region.

The 19th Guards Mechanized Brigade is located as of 2012 in Zaslonovo, a few kilometres west of Lyepyel.

Today this district is famous for its health resorts surrounded by lakes and forest. The largest lake among them is Lyepyelskoye.

References

Districts of Vitebsk Region
Lepiel District